State Route 201 (SR 201) is a  long north–south state highway in the western portion of the U.S. state of Ohio. The southern terminus of SR 201 is at an interchange with the SR 4 freeway in Dayton.

Route description

Along its path, SR 201 passes through the eastern portion of Montgomery County and the eastern portion of Miami County.  There are no segments of SR 201 that are included as a part of the National Highway System.

SR 201 begins in Dayton, within the same interchange complex that also features the southern terminus of SR 202. Northbound SR 204 begins on a ramp from SR 4 to Troy Street and Valley Street. At the bottom of the ramp, SR 201 reaches Troy Street, also designated as SR 202. SR 201 travels east along Herman Street before turning north onto Valley Street. The southbound direction of SR 201, designated SR 201-D by the Ohio Department of Transportation, traveled south along Valley Street from the Herman Street intersection, intersected Troy Street (also the southern terminus of SR 202), then traveled north on Keowee Street before turning left onto the ramp to southbound SR 4 ending at the ramp's merge with the freeway.

SR 201 follows Valley Street until the intersection with Brandt Street, and then follows Brandt Street northward toward Riverside. After entering Riverside, Brandt Street changes its name to Brandt Pike. SR 201 continues as Brandt Pike (even as it again passes inside Dayton city limits) through Huber Heights until it reaches the unincorporated community of Brandt in Bethel Township, Miami County. From there it loses its alternative name and continues northward, ending near Casstown, at the intersection with SR 55.

The portion of SR 201 between Chambersburg Road and Taylorsville Road in Huber Heights is designated "U.S.M.C. Lance Corporal Dustin R. Fitzgerald 'Dusty' Memorial Highway", in honor of a Wayne High School graduate who died on August 18, 2004, from injuries sustained in a non-combat related vehicle accident in Anbar Province, Iraq.

History
The SR 201 designation was applied in 1923. It was originally routed from its southern terminus in Dayton to its junction with U.S. Route 40 (US 40) in Brandt. SR 201 was extended to the north in 1937, routed from US 40 to SR 55.

, SR 201's southern terminus was located in Downtown Dayton. It began at the intersection of Third Street and Patterson Boulevard (with Patterson Boulevard carrying SR 4 and this point also marking the former southern terminus of SR 202) and followed Patterson Boulevard north, First Street east, and Keowee Street north across the Mad River. The three state routes would turn onto Valley Street where SR 202 split off the concurrency at Troy Street, SR 4 at the ramps to the freeway, SR 201 continuing on the route it travels today. The truncation of SR 201 occurred at the same time as the relocation of SR 4 out of Downtown Dayton onto the US 35 and Interstate 75 freeways.

Major intersections

References

201
Transportation in Montgomery County, Ohio
Transportation in Miami County, Ohio